National Route 431 is a national highway of Japan connecting Izumo, Shimane and Yonago, Tottori in Japan, with a total length of 93.5 km (58.1 mi).

References

National highways in Japan
Roads in Shimane Prefecture
Roads in Tottori Prefecture